Malaysia competed at the 2018 Summer Youth Olympics in Buenos Aires, Argentina from 6 October to 18 October 2018. The chef-de-mission of the contingent was former two-time Olympian archer Cheng Chu Sian. Malaysia won its first gold medal at an Olympic event, having previously won silver and bronze medals.

Goh Jin Wei became the first athlete to win a Youth Olympic Games gold medal for Malaysia the second Malaysian to emerge victorious at the Youth Olympics since shuttler Cheam June Wei, who won mixed doubles gold under the Mixed-NOCs flag in 2014, and The national men's junior hockey 5s squad claimed the second gold medal for the Malaysian contingent at the 2018 Youth Olympic Games in Buenos Aires, Argentina. Meanwhile, National teen gymnast Rayna Hoh Khai Ling bagged a silver medal at the Youth Olympic Games through Mixed multi-discipline team in Gymnastics was not credited to the individual nation's medal tally as the event was a mixed-National Olympic Committees event in which athletes from different nations team up to compete under the Olympic flag.

As squash contested as demonstration sports in the games, The national junior reckons squash's Chan Yiwen and  Siow Yee Xian being named the ambassador for the Youth Olympic Games in Buenos Aires, Argentina and will be among 36 players from 27 nations who will get a chance to experience the sport's first taste of Olympic competition. They debuted at the Youth Olympics as an exhibition sport with no medals at stake will stand the sport in good stead as it bids to get into the 2024 Summer Olympics in Paris.

Media coverage
Satellite television company Astro broadcast the sporting event in Malaysia.

Medalists

Medals awarded to participants of Mixed-NOC teams are represented in italics. These medals are not included towards the individual NOC medal tally.

Medalists in mixed NOCs events

Athletics

 Boys' 100m - Muhammad Fakhrul Abdul Aziz

Track event

Badminton

Malaysia qualified one player based on the Badminton Junior World Rankings.

 Girls' singles - Goh Jin Wei

Singles

Mixed Teams

Diving

 Boys' 10m Platform - Jellson Jabillin
 Girls' 3m Springboard - Kimberly Bong Qian Ping
 Girls' 10m Platform - Kimberly Bong Qian Ping

Field hockey

Malaysia qualified one event based on its performance at the 2018 Asian Youth Olympic Games Qualifier.

 Boys' Tournament

 Preliminary round

Quarterfinals

Semifinals

Gold medal game

Gymnastics

Artistic
Malaysia qualified one gymnast based on its performance at the 2018 Asian Junior Championship.

 Girls' artistic individual all-around - Zarith Imaan Khalid

Girls

Rhythmic
Malaysia qualified one gymnast based on its performance at the 2018 Asian Junior Championship.

 Girls' rhythmic individual all-around - Rayna Hoh Khai Ling

Individual

Mixed Team

Swimming

 Boys' 50m Butterfly - Low Zheng Yong
 Boys' 100m Butterfly - Low Zheng Yong
 Boys' 200m Butterfly - Low Zheng Yong
 Boys' 400m Freestyle - Arvin Chahal
 Boys' 200m Individual Medley - Low Zheng Yong
 Boys' 200m Individual Medley - Arvin Chahal

Boys

Table tennis

Malaysia qualified one table tennis player based on its performance at the Road to Buenos Aires (Asia) series. Later Malaysia qualified a female table tennis player based on its performance at the Road to Buenos Aires (Oceania) series.

 Boys' singles - Javen Choong
 Girls' singles - Alice Li Sian Chang

Singles

Mixed International Team

Triathlon

Malaysia qualified one athlete based on its performance at the 2018 Asian Youth Olympic Games Qualifier.

 Boys' individual - Chong Xian Hao
Boys

References

2018 in Malaysian sport
Nations at the 2018 Summer Youth Olympics
Malaysia at the Youth Olympics